Chikkadu Dorakadu is a 1988 Telugu-language action film, produced by S. P. Venkanna Babu for Maheswari Movies and directed by Relangi Narasimha Rao. It stars Rajendra Prasad, Rajani  and music composed by Raj–Koti.

Plot
Raja and Rani are petty thieves, they are students of a thieves college headed by Principal Krishna Paramatma. In the beginning, their acquaintance starts with funny quarrels and later both of them fall in love. Parallelly, Gayatri Devi owner of Ratnagiri estate, she has two sons Pedababu Pradeep and Chinababu Dileep. Pradeep died in a car accident, he has a wife Sumitra and three children. Sumitra went into mental shock in that accident. Meanwhile, Dileep is studying at states. Therefore, Gayatri Devi's three brothers Satyam, Sivam and Sundaram are looking after her property. All of them are criminals, who have murdered Pradeep, waiting for an opportunity to kill Dileep also to grab their property and most valuable the family heritage Suryakanthi diamond. Once in the city, the trio surprises to see Raja who resembles Dileep. So, they make a plan and replaces him instead of Dileep by telling him cock and bull story and luring with money. On the other side, Sundaram secretly gives a deal to Krishna Paramatma for the robbery of Suryakanthi diamond. He assigns the task to Rani and she too reaches the estate as a teacher to the children in the name of Seeta Devi. Both Raja & Rani meet there but they act like as if they don't know each other. After some time, the trio's kill Dileep keeps the blame on Raja and makes him arrested. But surprisingly Dileep comes back and Raja also escapes from jail to revenge against the trio. In this process, Rani detects that Raja is only playing the double game as Dileep too. When she questions about this, he reveals the depravity and evil plans of the trio and he is out with the help of S.I.Rama Rao the wellwisher of the family to bring out the crimes of the trio. Rest of the story is a comic tale, that Raja protecting the family, teasing the trio and seeing their end.

Cast

Rajendra Prasad as Raja & Chinnababu Dileep (Dual Role) 
Rajani as Rani / Seeta Devi
Satyanarayana as Peddodu Satyam
Gollapudi Maruti Rao as Principal Krishna Paramatma
Giri Babu as Chinnodu Sivam
Ranganath as S. I. Rama Rao
Suthi Veerabhadra Rao as Head Constable
Suthi Velu as Dumbu
Allu Ramalingaiah as Teacher
Brahmanandam as Bullodu Sundaram 
Chidatala Appa Rao as Thief
Satti Babu as Thief
Madan Mohan as Lawyer Tikamaka Rao
Malladi as Judge
Manjula as Gayatri Devi
Jyothi as Sumitra
Maya as Kasulamma

Soundtrack

Music composed by Raj–Koti. Lyrics were written by Veturi. Music released on LEO Audio Company.

Others
 VCDs and DVDs on - SHALIMAR Video Company, Hyderabad

References

1988 films
Films scored by Raj–Koti
Indian comedy films
Films directed by Relangi Narasimha Rao
1980s Telugu-language films
1988 comedy films